Britteny Cox (born 29 September 1994) is an Australian mogul skier. Growing up in the Victorian alpine resort of Falls Creek, Cox was born into a mogul skiing environment, with her family passionate mogul skiers.

Cox was the youngest athlete to compete at the Vancouver 2010 Olympic Winter Games.

Since the Vancouver Olympics, Cox has continued to improve, winning Australia's first ever female World Cup mogul skiing medal, after finishing third at the 2011–12 FIS Freestyle Skiing World Cup in Deer Valley, Utah. In 2013 Cox won her second World Cup bronze at the 2012–13 FIS Freestyle Skiing World Cup. Brittany Cox won the Crystal Globe for Women's Moguls at the 2016-2017 FIS Freestyle Skiing World Cup with 7 victories and several other podium finishes. She is the first female Australian Mogul skier to win the crystal globe.

She competed at the FIS Freestyle World Ski Championships 2011, FIS Freestyle World Ski Championships 2013, and at the 2014 Winter Olympics.

Britteny is a scholarship athlete with the Olympic Winter Institute of Australia and the Australian Institute of Sport.

References

External links
 
 Britteny Cox's profile at the International Ski Federation

Olympic freestyle skiers of Australia
Freestyle skiers at the 2010 Winter Olympics
Freestyle skiers at the 2014 Winter Olympics
Freestyle skiers at the 2018 Winter Olympics
Freestyle skiers at the 2022 Winter Olympics
1994 births
Living people
Australian female freestyle skiers
People from Wodonga
Sportswomen from Victoria (Australia)